Deer Creek, formerly More's Creek, is a creek in Tulare County, California.  Its source is in the on the west slope of the Greenhorn Mountains, in the Sierra Nevada Mountain range.  From there Deer Creek runs west to terminate at the Lakeland and Homeland Canals in the San Joaquin Valley just east of the Tulare - Kings County border.  Originally it ran into Tulare Lake before it was diverted for agriculture.

References

Rivers of the Sierra Nevada (United States)
Rivers of Tulare County, California
Tulare Basin watershed
Central Valley Project
Greenhorn Mountains
Rivers of Northern California
Rivers of the Sierra Nevada in California